Turumba is a 1983 Filipino film written, produced, and directed by Kidlat Tahimik. The film was originally made as a 45-minute short film titled Olympic Gold, commissioned by West German broadcaster ZDF for the 1981 television series Vater Unser.

Turumba was given a limited release in the United States by documentarian Les Blank's Flower Films on April 11, 1984.

References

External links
Kidlat Tahimik official site
Flower Films official site

1983 films
1983 independent films
Films about festivals
Films about the 1972 Summer Olympics
Films about toys
Films directed by Kidlat Tahimik
Films set in 1971
Films set in 1972
Films set in Laguna (province)
Films shot in Laguna (province)
Philippine drama films
Religion in Laguna (province)
Tagalog-language films
West German films
1980s German films